Kenya Reinsurance Corporation Limited commonly referred to as Kenya Re is a reinsurance company based in Nairobi, Kenya.

Overview 
Kenya Re is the oldest reinsurer in Eastern and Central Africa and serves over 265 insurances companies in 62 countries across Africa, the Middle East and Asia with over 50 percent of its revenue being generated from foreign markets. The firm provides reinsurance products to both life and general insurance. Kenya Re is listed on the Nairobi Securities Exchange.

History 
Kenya Reinsurance Corporation was established through an Act of Parliament in December 1970. The firm commenced reinsurance business in January 1971. Kenya Re launched its IPO in 2007 leading to the government cutting its stake in the reinsurer.

Ownership 
The shares of the stock of Kenya Reinsurance Corporation are traded on the Nairobi Securities Exchange, under the symbol: KNRE. , the shareholding in the group's stock was as depicted in the table below:

Governance 
Kenya Re is governed by an eleven-person Board of Directors with Jennifer Karina serving as the chairperson of the group and Jadiah Mwarania as the managing director.

See also 
 List of Insurance companies in Kenya
 Nairobi Securities Exchange
 Africa Re

References 

Financial services companies established in 1971
Reinsurance companies
Insurance companies of Kenya
Companies listed on the Nairobi Securities Exchange
Companies based in Nairobi
Government-owned insurance companies
Kenyan companies established in 1971